Boussard is a surname.  Notable people with the name include:

Hervé Boussard (1966–2013), French cyclist
Vincent Boussard (born 1969), French opera and theatre director

See also
Boussart, surname
Broussard, surname
Bussard, surname